X-Squad, known in Japan as , is a PlayStation 2 launch title developed by Electronic Arts Square and published by EA Games. It was released on August 3, 2000 in Japan, October 26 in the U.S. and on December 8 in Europe.

Plot 
In this game the protagonist is Ash, the leader of X-Squad, along with teammates Maya, Melinda and Judd. Set in 2037, W-Squad has been defeated, Doctor Bianca Noble has been kidnapped and her experiment Project Medusa has been stolen.

Gameplay
X-Squad takes the form of a third person shooter, with the two analog sticks moving the character and camera respectively. In the game the player leads a group of up to three soldiers through nine levels, giving them commands to perform helpful actions. The player can also use the R1 and L1 buttons strafe.

Reception 

The game received "mixed" reviews according to the review aggregation website Metacritic. Randy Nelson of NextGen called it "A concept game that unfortunately doesn't even get its concept right." In Japan, Famitsu gave it a score of 30 out of 40.

Notes

References

External links 
 

2000 video games
Action-adventure games
Electronic Arts games
PlayStation 2 games
PlayStation 2-only games
Single-player video games
Stealth video games
Third-person shooters
Video games developed in Japan
Video games set in the 2030s
Video games developed in the United States